Twinsburg Township is one of the nine townships of Summit County, Ohio, United States. The 2010 census found 2,282 people in the unincorporated portions of the township.

Geography
Twinsburg Township's current area is much smaller than it was originally. It is also discontinuous.

Original boundaries
 Northfield Center Township, to the west
 Bedford Township, Cuyahoga County, to the northwest
 Solon Township, Cuyahoga County, to the north
 Bainbridge Township, Geauga County, to the northeast
 Aurora Township, Portage County, to the east
 Streetsboro Township, to the southeast
 Hudson Township, to the south
 Boston Township, to the southwest

Current boundaries
 Macedonia - west
 Twinsburg - northwest
 Solon - north
 Reminderville  - northeast
 Aurora - east
 Hudson - south

Several municipalities occupy what was originally part of Twinsburg Township:
Part of the city of Macedonia, in the west
The village of Reminderville, in the northeast
The city of Twinsburg, in the north and center

Name
It is the only Twinsburg Township statewide. The name of the township comes from the Wilcox brothers, Aaron and Moses, who were twins.

History
Attempts at merging the city and townships of Twinsburg have not been successful.

Twinsburg Township's land has been in the following counties:

Government
The township is governed by a three-member board of trustees, who are elected in November of odd-numbered years to a four-year term beginning on the following January 1. Two are elected in the year after the presidential election and one is elected in the year before it. There is also an elected township fiscal officer, who serves a four-year term beginning on April 1 of the year after the election, which is held in November of the year before the presidential election. Vacancies in the fiscal officership or on the board of trustees are filled by the remaining trustees. As of 2016, the board was composed of chairman Thomas O. Schmidt, and members Jamey DeFabio and James C. Balogh, and the fiscal officer was Tania Johnson.

Transportation and public services
 Interstate 480 and State Route 14, cosigned, pass through Twinsburg Township with no exits.
 State Route 82 passes through the township, heading east towards Aurora.
 State Route 91, connecting Hudson and Twinsburg, passes through.  
 A new facility for Twinsburg Township will be located on Enterprise Parkway off Rt. 91.
 There are several parcels along Liberty Road under township jurisdiction and surrounded by land that is part of the City of Twinsburg.

The township has two zip codes. Much of the township, especially along Twinsburg Road and Old Mill Road, shares the ZIP code 44236 with Hudson and the other is 44087.

References

Further reading
  GenealogyInc, (1999-2005). County Formation Maps. Retrieved May 2, 2005.
 
 
  County of Summit (2005). TAX YEAR 2004/COLLECTION YEAR 2005 FULL TAX RATE SUMMARY SHEET. Retrieved June 18, 2005.

External links
Township website
County website

Townships in Summit County, Ohio
Townships in Ohio